The 2020 United States House of Representatives elections in Arizona was held on November 3, 2020, to elect the nine U.S. representatives from the state of Arizona, one from each of the state's nine congressional districts. The elections coincided with the 2020 U.S. presidential election, as well as other elections to the House of Representatives, elections to the United States Senate and various state and local elections.
This election was the first time since 1990 in which no third-party candidates appeared on the ballot in the House of Representatives elections.

Arizona was notable in 2020 for being one of two states, the other being  North Carolina, in which the party receiving the majority of votes held a minority of congressional seats.

Overview

Results of the 2020 United States House of Representatives elections in Arizona by district:

District 1

The 1st district is based in the northeastern part of the state, encompassing the Phoenix and Tucson metropolitan areas, taking in Casa Grande, Maricopa, Oro Valley, and Marana. The district also includes the Navajo Nation, Hopi Reservation, and Gila River Indian Community. The incumbent is Democrat Tom O'Halleran, who was re-elected with 53.8% of the vote in 2018.

Democratic primary

Candidates

Declared
 Tom O'Halleran, incumbent U.S. Representative
 Eva Putzova, former Flagstaff city councilwoman

Withdrawn
 Barbara McGuire, former state senator
 Larry Williams, retail worker

Endorsements

Primary results

Republican primary

Candidates

Declared
 Nolan Reidhead, attorney
 Tiffany Shedd, attorney, small business owner, firearms instructor, and candidate for Arizona's 1st congressional district in 2018

Withdrawn
 John Moore, mayor of Williams
 Doyel Shamley, former Apache County supervisor
 Chris Taylor, Safford city councilman

Declined
 Curt Schilling, former Major League Baseball pitcher for Arizona Diamondbacks and Boston Red Sox

Endorsements

Primary results

General election

Predictions

Results

District 2

The 2nd district is located in southeastern Arizona, encompassing the eastern Tucson area. The incumbent is Democrat Ann Kirkpatrick, who flipped the district and was elected with 54.7% of the vote in 2018.

Democratic primary

Candidates

Declared
 Ann Kirkpatrick, incumbent U.S. Representative
 Peter Quilter, national security professional

Endorsements

Primary results

Republican primary

Candidates

Declared
 Brandon Martin, U.S. Army veteran and candidate for Arizona's 2nd congressional district in 2018
 Joseph Morgan, support technician
 Noran Ruden, businessman

Withdrawn
 Mike Ligon, author
 Shay Stautz, former lobbyist for University of Arizona
 Justine Wadsack, realtor and small business owner (running for State Senate)

Primary results

General election

Predictions

Results

District 3

The 3rd district encompasses southwestern Arizona, taking in Yuma, western Tucson, as well as stretching into the western suburbs of Phoenix, including Goodyear, Avondale, southern Buckeye, and a small portion of West Phoenix. The incumbent is Democrat Raúl Grijalva, who was re-elected with 63.9% of the vote in 2018.

Democratic primary

Candidates

Declared
 Raúl Grijalva, incumbent U.S. Representative

Primary results

Republican primary

Candidates

Declared
 Daniel Wood, U.S. Marine Corps veteran

Withdrew
 Steve Ronnebeck, former auto mechanic

Primary results

General election

Predictions

Results

District 4

The 4th district is located in north-central Arizona, taking in Lake Havasu City, Prescott, and the Phoenix exurbs, including San Tan Valley, Apache Junction, and northern Buckeye. The incumbent is Republican Paul Gosar, who was re-elected with 68.2% of the vote in 2018.

Republican primary

Candidates

Declared
 Paul Gosar, incumbent U.S. Representative
 Anne Marie Ward, former business consultant and former staffer to U.S. Senator Martha McSally

Primary results

Democratic primary

Candidates

Declared
 Delina DiSanto, businesswoman and candidate for Arizona's 4th congressional district in 2018
 Stuart "Stu" Starky, nominee for U.S. Senate in 2004 and former school principal

Primary results

General election

Predictions

Results

District 5

The 5th district is centered around the eastern suburbs of Phoenix, including Gilbert, Queen Creek, southern and eastern Chandler, and eastern Mesa. The incumbent is Republican Andy Biggs, who was re-elected with 59.4% of the vote in 2018.

Republican primary

Candidates

Declared
 Andy Biggs, incumbent U.S. Representative

Primary results

Democratic primary

Candidates

Declared
 Joan Greene, businesswoman and nominee for Arizona's 5th congressional district in 2018
 Jonathan Ireland, educator and musician
 Javier Ramos, attorney

Primary results

General election

Predictions

Results

District 6

The 6th district covers parts of the northeastern suburbs of Phoenix, containing Scottsdale, Paradise Valley, Cave Creek, Fountain Hills, as well as a portion of North Phoenix, including Deer Valley and Desert View. The incumbent is Republican David Schweikert, who was re-elected with 55.2% of the vote in 2018.

Republican primary

Candidates

Declared
 David Schweikert, incumbent U.S. Representative

Endorsements

Primary results

Democratic primary

Candidates

Declared
 Karl Gentles, businessman
 Anita Malik, businesswoman, entrepreneur, and nominee for Arizona's 6th congressional district in 2018
 Stephanie Rimmer, businesswoman
 Hiral Tipirneni, emergency room physician and nominee for Arizona's 8th congressional district in the 2018 special and general elections

Endorsements

Polling

Primary results

General election

Predictions

Polling
Graphical summary

with Generic Republican and Generic Democrat

Results

District 7

The 7th district encompasses Downtown Phoenix and western Phoenix, including the urban villages of Maryvale, Estrella, Laveen, South Mountain, Central City, Encanto, and Alhambra, as well as Tolleson and southern Glendale. The incumbent is Democrat Ruben Gallego, who was re-elected with 85.6% of the vote in 2018 without major-party opposition.

Democratic primary

Candidates

Declared
 Ruben Gallego, incumbent U.S. Representative

Primary results

Republican primary

Candidates

Declared
 Josh Barnett, entrepreneur

Primary results

General election

Predictions

Results

District 8

The 8th district encompasses the western and northwestern suburbs of Phoenix, taking in Surprise, Peoria, Litchfield Park, Anthem, northern Glendale, and parts of North Phoenix, including North Gateway and Rio Vista. The incumbent is Republican Debbie Lesko, who was re-elected with 55.5% of the vote in 2018.

Republican primary

Candidates

Declared
 Debbie Lesko, incumbent U.S. Representative

Endorsements

Primary results

Democratic primary

Candidates

Declared
 Michael Muscato, gym owner
 Bob Musselwhite, former Litchfield Park city manager and councilman
 Bob Olsen, attorney

Declined
 Hiral Tipirneni, physician and nominee for Arizona's 8th congressional district in 2018 (running for Arizona's 6th congressional district)

Endorsements

Primary results

General election

Predictions

Results

District 9

The 9th district is based in the Phoenix metro, and includes Tempe, southern Scottsdale, western Mesa, northwestern Chandler, and southern Phoenix, containing Ahwatukee and Camelback East. The incumbent is Democrat Greg Stanton, who was elected with 61.1% of the vote in 2018.

Democratic primary

Candidates

Declared
 Greg Stanton, incumbent U.S. Representative

Primary results

Republican primary

Candidates

Declared
 Dave Giles, businessman, candidate for Arizona's 9th congressional district in 2018 and nominee in 2016
 Sam Huang, Chandler city councilman
 Nicholas Tutora, pharmacist

Primary results

Independents

Candidates

Withdrawn
 Irina Baroness von Behr, Republican candidate for Arizona's 9th congressional district in 2018

General election

Predictions

Results

See also
 2020 Arizona elections

Notes
Partisan clients

General notes

References

External links
 

Official campaign websites for 1st district candidates
 Tom O'Halleran (D) for Congress
 Tiffany Shedd (R) for Congress

Official campaign websites for 2nd district candidates
 Ann Kirkpatrick (D) for Congress
 Brandon Martin (R) for Congress

Official campaign websites for 3rd district candidates
 Raúl Grijalva (D) for Congress
 Daniel Wood (R) for Congress 

Official campaign websites for 4th district candidates
 Delina DiSanto (D) for Congress
 Paul Gosar (R) for Congress

Official campaign websites for 5th district candidates
 Andy Biggs (R) for Congress
 Joan Greene (D) for Congress

Official campaign websites for 6th district candidates
 David Schweikert (R) for Congress
 Hiral Tipirneni (D) for Congress 

Official campaign websites for 7th district candidates
 Josh Barnett (R) for Congress
 Ruben Gallego (D) for Congress

Official campaign websites for 8th district candidates
 Debbie Lesko (R) for Congress
 Michael Muscato (D) for Congress

Official campaign websites for 9th district candidates
 Dave Giles (R) for Congress
 Greg Stanton (D) for Congress

Arizona
2020
United States House of Representatives